The 2016 United States Olympic Team Trials for wrestling were held at the Carver-Hawkeye Arena of Iowa City, Iowa, on April 8–10, 2016. This event determined the representative of the United States of America for the 2016 Summer Olympics at each Olympic weight class.

Tournament Format 

 Challenge Tournament–(single elimination)- The first part of the trials determined who advanced over to the best–of–three finale and it took place in the first day of competition.
 Championship Series–(best‐of‐3 match final wrestle‐off)- In the second part of the trials, the finals which determined the ultimate winner took place, in the second day of competition.

Medal summary

Men's freestyle

Women's freestyle

Men's Greco–Roman

References 

Wrestling qualification for the 2016 Summer Olympics